Anneli Näsström (born 29 October 1961) is a Swedish luger. She competed in the women's singles event at the 1980 Winter Olympics.

References

External links
 

1961 births
Living people
Swedish female lugers
Olympic lugers of Sweden
Lugers at the 1980 Winter Olympics
Sportspeople from Stockholm